Senta (minor planet designation: 550 Senta) is a minor planet orbiting the Sun that was discovered by German astronomer Max Wolf on 16 November 1904, from Heidelberg.

Photometric observations of this asteroid made at the Torino Observatory in Italy during 1990–1991 were used to determine a synodic rotation period of 20.555 ± 0.01 hours.

In light of Max Wolf's propensity around the time of discovery to name asteroids after operatic heroines, it is likely that the asteroid is named after Senta, the heroine of Richard Wagner's opera The Flying Dutchman.

References

External links 
 
 

000550
Discoveries by Max Wolf
Named minor planets
550 Senta
000550
19041116